Paradrillia lithoria is a species of sea snail, a marine gastropod mollusk in the family Horaiclavidae, the turrids.

Description
The length of the shell attains 8 mm, its diameter 2.5 mm.

This is a small highly coloured, fusiform species, with a conspicuous, spiral, swollen, nodulous angle just above the centre of the whorls. It contains eight whorls, of which two in the protoconch. The aperture has a square-ovate shape. The outer lip is thin. The sinus is wide but not deep. The siphonal canal is short.

Distribution
This marine species occurs off Bahrein and in the Persian Gulf.

References

External links
  Tucker, J.K. 2004 Catalog of recent and fossil turrids (Mollusca: Gastropoda). Zootaxa 682:1-1295.

lithoria
Gastropods described in 1903